The 2019 Southland Conference women's soccer tournament, the postseason women's soccer tournament for the Southland Conference, was held from November 6  to November 10, 2019. The seven-match tournament took place at the Bill Stephens Track/Soccer Complex in Conway, Arkansas. The eight-team single-elimination tournament consisted of three rounds based on seeding from regular season conference play.  The defending champions were the Abilene Christian Wildcats, but they were unable to defend their title falling in the first round to McNeese State 2–1.  The Lamar Cardinals won the tournament, defeating Northwestern State 3–1 in the final.   The title was the second overall for the Lamar Cardinals program, both of which have come under head coach Steve Holeman.

Media and TV
Broadcast of the quarterfinal and semifinal rounds were on the Southland Conference Digital Network.  The championship game was broadcast on ESPN+.

Bracket

Source:

Schedule

Quarterfinals

Semifinals

Final

Statistics

Goalscorers 
6 Goals
 Esther Okoronkwo (Lamar)

3 Goals
 Lucy Ashworth (Lamar)

1 Goal

 Karleigh Acosta (Northwestern State)
 Dana Curtis (Texas A&M-Corpus Christi)
 Abby Deakin (Texas A&M-Corpus Christi)
 Olivia Draguicevich (Northwestern State)
 Emma Gibbs (Texas A&M-Corpus Christi)
 Nicole Henry (Northwestern State)
 Kaisa Juvonen (Lamar)
 Anna Loftus (Lamar)
 Sophia Manibo (Lamar)
 Mattie Musser (Stephen F. Austin)
 Alisha Nesbitt (Lamar)
 Jade Piper (Incarnate Word)
 Andrea Reyes (Incarnate Word)
 Mariah Ruelas (McNesse State)
 Katelyn Termini (Stephen F. Austin)
 Jayden Wheeler (Northwestern State)
 Kalee Williams (Northwestern State)
 Caylen Wright (Abilene Christian)
 Rachel Young (McNeese State)

Own Goals
 Stephen F. Austin vs. Lamar

All-Tournament team

Source: 

MVP in bold

References 

 
Southland Conference Women's Soccer Tournament